Acrocomia is a genus of palms which is native to the Neotropics, ranging from Mexico in the north, through Central America and the Caribbean, and through South America south to Argentina.

Description
Acrocomia is a genus of spiny, pinnate-leaved palms which range from large trees to small palms with short, subterranean stems.

The species bears branched inflorescences which are located among the leaves.  The unisexual flowers; female flowers are born near the base of the inflorescence, while male flowers are borne towards the tips.  Fruit are large, single-seeded, and vary in colour from yellow, to orange, to brown.

Ricardo Vargas‑Carpintero et al. have concluded that "main research gaps are associated with genotype–environment interaction,
planting material, crop management, and sustainable cropping systems. Overall, we conclude that acrocomia is at an early
phase of development as an alternative and multipurpose crop and its up-scaling requires the integration of sustainability
strategies tailored to location-based social-ecological conditions."

Species
 Acrocomia aculeata (Jacq.) Lodd. ex R.Keith - Mexico, Central America, West Indies, northern South America
 Acrocomia crispa (Kunth) C. Baker ex. Becc. - Cuba
 Acrocomia emensis (Toledo) Lorenzi - Brazil 
 Acrocomia glaucescens Lorenzi - Brazil 
 Acrocomia hassleri (Barb.Rodr.) W.J.Hahn - Mato Grosso do Sul, Paraguay
 Acrocomia intumescens Drude - Brazil 
 Acrocomia media O.F.Cook - Puerto Rico, Virgin Islands
 Acrocomia mexicana Karw. ex Mart. - Yucatán, Mexico 
 Acrocomia totai Mart.  - Bolivia, Paraguay, northern Argentina, southern Brazil

References

External links
 Acrocomia research at the University of Hohenheim

 
Arecaceae genera
Neotropical realm flora